John Sinclair, Lord Murkle (died 5 June 1755) was a Scottish judge.

A son of John Sinclair, 8th Earl of Caithness and Janet Carmichael of the Hyndford family, he was admitted to the Faculty of Advocates on 7 February 1713. On 18 January 1721 he was appointed one of the Solicitors General for Scotland. He was elevated to the bench on the death of Sir William Calderwood of Polton on 3 November 1733, with the judicial title Lord Murkle.  He died in Edinburgh on 5 June 1755.

Sources

An Historical Account of the Senators of the College of Justice from its Institution in MDXXXII by George Brunton and David Haig, published by Thomas Clark MDCCCXXXII

1755 deaths
Lord Advocates
Murkle
Scottish lawyers
Members of the Faculty of Advocates
Year of birth unknown
Solicitors General for Scotland
Younger sons of earls